The 2019–20 Liga Națională is the 62nd season of Romanian Handball League, the top-level men's professional handball league. The league comprises 14 teams. Dinamo București are the defending champions.

League table

References

External links
 Romanian Handball Federaration 

Liga Națională (men's handball)
2019 in Romanian sport
2020 in Romanian sport
2019–20 domestic handball leagues